"Love Is a Bourgeois Construct" is a song by English synth-pop duo Pet Shop Boys from their twelfth studio album, Electric (2013). It was released on 2 September 2013 as the album's third single. The song is based on the 1982 instrumental "Chasing Sheep Is Best Left to Shepherds", a minimalist piece by Michael Nyman, which was initially based on a hook by Henry Purcell.

The Guardian named "Love Is a Bourgeois Construct" the fourth best track of the year, and Slant Magazine listed the song number 18 on its "25 Best Singles of 2013" list.

Release
The single was released digitally on 2 September 2013 in two bundles, followed by a CD single on 30 September. Both the physical and digital formats include remixes by Little Boots, The Penelopes and Dave Audé, as well as two previously unreleased B-sides, "Entschuldigung!" and "Get It Online". The twelve-inch single was released on 9 December 2013.

Live performances
It was performed on select dates of the Electric Tour.

Track listings

Charts

References

2013 singles
2013 songs
Hi-NRG songs
Pet Shop Boys songs
Songs written by Neil Tennant
Songs written by Chris Lowe
Song recordings produced by Stuart Price